Hubkiv is a village in Rivne Raion, Rivne Oblast, Ukraine, but was formerly administered within Berezne Raion. In 2001, the community had 788 residents. Postal code — 34654.

History 
The first mention about a village Hubkiv is dated 1504 by a year, when became drenched and a township was pranged by Tatars. In more late acts sometimes named as Khupkiv.

A defensive castle ruins of which were until now saved on a high bank on the fence surrounding village of village was here built in a ÕV item.

From the first half of ÕV² item the proprietors of Gubkova were Semashki, in a ÕV²² item passes to Danilovichiv, then — Cetneriv. A township and castle tested frequent attacks. In 1596 laid hands on a castle the troops of Hryhorij Lobodi. In the manifest in 1704 marked, that a township during the stands of the Moscow army is robbed and destroyed and in him there is not a single korchmi or vinnici. in 1708 gubkivskiy a castle was pranged by Swedes, and city falling into a decay, fairs and auctions left off to be conducted.

References

External links 
 Castles and temples of Ukraine. Hubkiv 
 ua.vlasenko. Photos 
 Ukraine Inkognita. Hubkiv 
 Article Hubków in the Geographical Dictionary of the Kingdom of Poland, Volume III (Haag — Kępy), 1882 year 

Villages in Rivne Raion